Beyond Words (simplified Chinese: 爱要怎么说) is a Malaysian television drama series produced by Mediacorp Studios Malaysia in 2015. It revolves around the life of a white collar worker, whose plan to retire in his early 50s gets thwarted when a series of family problems crop up: his daughter-in-law gets in trouble with the law, he uses his savings to bail her out of trouble and his younger sister sacrifices her personal savings to tide the family through its financial woes. He has no choice but to return to the workforce and lands a job in the hotel business where he enjoys a career reboot. But things go awry when he ends up falling for his public relations officer colleague.

The series began airing on Mediacorp Channel 8 on 17 March 2016 with 30 episodes.

Episode guide

See also
Beyond Words
List of MediaCorp Channel 8 Chinese Drama Series (2010s)

References

Lists of Singaporean television series episodes
Lists of Malaysian television series episodes